Bernard Lewis (born 12 March 1945) is a former Welsh professional footballer.

Born in Merthyr Tydfil, Lewis was working as an apprentice mechanic before joining Cardiff City as a part-time professional, making his debut in a 2–1 defeat to Rotherham United in January 1964 as a right winger, although he would switch to the left soon after. He played for the Wales U23 side and in November 1967 he was signed by Watford for £7,000. On his debut for the club he played a part in all but one of the goals during a 7-1 thrashing of Grimsby Town, but he struggled to hold down a regular first team spot and was allowed to join Southend United in 1970 where he finished his league career before joining Chelmsford City.

References

1945 births
Welsh footballers
Wales under-23 international footballers
Cardiff City F.C. players
Watford F.C. players
Southend United F.C. players
English Football League players
Living people
Association football wingers
Chelmsford City F.C. players